Special elections to the California State Senate are called by the Governor of California when a vacancy arises within the State Senate. Most special elections are conducted in two rounds. The first is an open primary and the candidate with the most votes must have a majority of the votes plus one to win the seat. If no candidate wins a majority, a second round is held with the two top candidates regardless of party.

Recall elections, the process by which voters petition for the removal of an elected official, are also included.

List of special elections 
The dates listed indicate the time of the final election, either a runoff election or the open primary round if no second round was held.

List of recall elections
When applicable, the candidate who succeeded the recalled state senator is listed. If the recall election was not successful the winner is listed as "none".

Results

2014 35th district special election

2015 7th district special election

2015 21st district special election

2015 37th district special election

2018 29th district special recall election

2018 32nd district special election 

The first round of the special election was consolidated with the regularly scheduled primary election. Although most of the candidates in the two contests were the same, the results were very different. Rita Topalian finished first in both races, but different candidates finished in second place. Vanessa Delgado finished in 2nd place in the special election, but 3rd place in the regularly scheduled primary election. She received a similar number of votes in both races, but candidate Bob Archuleta received about 54% more votes in the regularly scheduled election than he did in the special election. The different results have been attributed to the different order in which the candidates were listed on the ballot.

2019 1st district special election

2019 33rd district special election

2020 28th district special election

2021 30th district special election

References

Special
California State Senate
California State Senate